Ngolo, N'Golo, or NGolo may refer to:

Geography 
 N'Goloblasso, town in Ivory Coast
 N'Golobougou, commune in Mali
 N'Golodiana, commune in Mali
 N'golofesso, village in Burkina Faso
 N'Golonianasso, commune in Mali
Ngolo River, river in Gabon

People 

 Albertina Navemba Ngolo Felisberto, Angolan politician
 Gilbert Evenom Ngolo, Malagasy politician
 N'Golo Kanté, French footballer
 Ngolo Diarra, King of the Bambara Empire from 1766 to 1795
 Pierre Ngolo, Congolese politician

Other 

 Engolo (also known as NGolo), African martial art
 Ngolo, dialect of the Mbosi language
 Ngolo, variation of the Oroko language
Ngolokwangga, Aboriginal Australian people